Balcolyn is a suburb of the City of Lake Macquarie in New South Wales, Australia on a peninsula east of the town of Morisset on the western side of Lake Macquarie.

History 
Casuarina (she-oak) trees were situated among the waterfront. This attracted the timber industry, as timber from such trees were good for roofing. Shingle Splitters Point (named after the workers, who were called "shingle splitters") was used as an anchorage and loading place.

Crusaders 
The Crusader Union of Australia runs a Christian education campsite at 40 Yarrawonga Park Road, Balcolyn. It is located on the shores of Lake Macquarie and has accommodation for 112 guests. There are facilities for sport and recreational activities including a jetty for sailing, canoeing, paddle boarding and fishing.

References

External links
 History of Balcolyn

Suburbs of Lake Macquarie